Leslie Osborn (born October 17, 1963) is an American politician serving as the Oklahoma labor commissioner. She was previously a member of the Oklahoma House of Representatives from 2008 to 2018.

Early life and career
Leslie was born in Salina, Kansas. She graduated from Oklahoma State University in 1986.

Career 
Osborn has owned her own business for 22 years, Osborn Pick-Up Accessories.

Oklahoma House of Representatives
Osborn won the November 2008 general election for an open seat to represent District 47 of the Oklahoma House of Representatives, which includes the towns of Mustang and Tuttle and parts of Canadian County and Grady County.

The state lawmaker was appointed by T.W. Shannon to chair the Judiciary Committee in 2013, the first female in state history to do so.

In 2013, she ran the landmark workers’ compensation reform bill, changing the judicial system to an updated administrative system.

From December 2014 to December 2015 she served as chair of the budget subcommittee on Natural Resources & Regulatory Services.

On December 9, 2016, House Speaker Charles McCall appointed Representative Osborn to chair the House Appropriations and Budget Committee, the first Republican female to do so.

Oklahoma labor commissioner

In November 2018, Osborn was elected labor commissioner and is serving a four-year term.

Personal life 
She is the mother of two children.

References

1963 births
21st-century American politicians
21st-century American women politicians
Living people
Republican Party members of the Oklahoma House of Representatives
Oklahoma Labor Commissioners
People from Mustang, Oklahoma
Politicians from Salina, Kansas
Women state legislators in Oklahoma